The Benazir Income Support Programme (BISP) is a federal unconditional cash transfer poverty reduction program in Pakistan. Launched in July 2008, it was the largest single social safety net program in the country with nearly Rs. 90 billion ($900 million) distributed to 5.4 million beneficiaries in 2016.

The program distributed Rs.19,338 (or approx. $195) per annum distributed per month in the year 2016. The stipend is linked to the Consumer Price Index and is paid through a smart card. The Department for International Development of the United Kingdom is the largest foreign backer of the program, providing $244 million (or 27%) of the total funds in 2016 with the Pakistani Government providing the rest.

As of 2020, BISP was surpassed by Ehsaas Programme as the largest social welfare programme in Pakistan. A separate ministry Poverty Alleviation and Social Safety (PASS) was established and Benazir Income Support Program was made part of the Poverty Alleviation and Social Security Division.

History
The Benazir Income Support Programme was established in 2008 by Yousaf Raza Gillani who took the advice of President Asif Ali Zardari.  The program's name is a tribute to former Prime Minister and widow of President Zardari, Benazir Bhutto, who was assassinated in 2007.

Since 2005, the purchasing power of many Pakistani families has been eroded by high inflation and the increasing cost of food and oil.  BISP arose against this backdrop as a means to address reductions in purchasing power.  Along with the economic development aims of the program, BISP also seeks to empower women by presenting cash transfers directly to female members of households.

BISP is currently the largest aid program in Pakistan and the government's third largest budgetary allocation.  BISP spending accounts for 0.3% of Pakistan's GDP.

In the 2008–2009 fiscal year, more than 3 million Pakistani families received cash transfers through BISP; this figure accounts for 1.5% of the general population and 10% of the population below the poverty level.  For the 2009–2010 fiscal year, the program was expanded to cover 5 million low-income families.  At the program's start in 2008, the Pakistani government allocated RS 34 billion, or $425 million, for BISP; the allocation doubled to RS 70 billion, or $875 million in the following year.

The Benazir Income Support Programme is planning to launch a new initiative that encourages human capital development through a conditional cash transfer.  The Waseela-e-Taleem initiative will condition cash payments on primary school enrolment for the children of eligible families. On 18 June 2017, BISP launched an e-commerce platform for its beneficiaries.

Program structure
The Benazir Income Support Programme has been implemented in the provinces of Punjab, Sindh, Baluchistan, and Khyber-Pakhtonnkhwa.  The program also operates in the federally administered regions of Azad Jammu and Kashmir, and the Islamabad Capital Territory.

In its first year of operation, recipients of BISP cash transfers were identified and selected by Parliamentarians through a process of recommendation.  Each Parliamentarian received 8,000 forms to distribute throughout his or her constituency.  Selected individuals underwent an eligibility verification process through the National Database and Registration Authority.  A final list of eligible families was generated and sent to the postal service.  Funds were disbursed from the Treasury directly to the postal service and then delivered to the female head of eligible households.

In April 2009, the process for identifying and selecting eligible families through Parliamentarian recommendation was ended.  The identification process has been reformed and now uses a Poverty Scorecard.  Through the Poverty Scorecard, families are identified through a proxy means test.  The Poverty Scorecard has been approved by the World Bank and requires families to answer 13 questions regarding assets and expenses in a survey.  The poverty survey has been tested in 16 districts and will be distributed nationwide.

Internal monitoring systems are being developed to track deliveries and payment amounts to eligible families.  Another mechanism to address corruption and political favouritism is being considered that would allow a neutral third party access to the list of eligible families to verify eligibility.

Recently, BISP has expanded to include several special initiatives.  The Waseela-e-Haq program empowers women through the provision of small loans.  A vocation training program, Waseela-e-Rozgar, offers members of eligible families up to 1 year of professional training.  The Waseela-e-Sehat program provides financial assistance specifically for obtaining basic health care.  BISP will launch its first program that conditions cash payments on schooling. The Waseela-e-Taleem initiative will require families receiving cash payments to enroll children between the ages of 5 to 12 to enroll in primary education.

BISP also provides cash payments for emergency relief efforts.  These payments are similar to the payments received by low-income families but are distributed to families affected by terrorism, war, and natural disasters such as earthquakes.

Eligibility 
To be eligible for cash payments under BISP, families must earn less than RS 6,000 per month; equivalent to $67.  Further eligibility requirements stipulate that:
Families must have a female applicant holding a valid ID card
An individual applicant must be a widowed or divorced female without male family members
Eligible families include those with physically or mentally disabled individuals

Families deemed ineligible for cash payments through BISP include those with:
Members employed by the Pakistani government, army, or any other government-affiliated agency
Members drawing a pension or receiving post-retirement benefits from the government
Family members owning more than 3 acres of farmland or more than 80 square yards of residential land
Members receiving income from other sources
Members holding a machine readable passport
Members with a National Identity Card for Overseas citizens
Members with a bank account excluding microfinance banks and those catering to low-income families

Benefits
Eligible families receive cash payments of 4834 quarterly.  This amount increases the purchasing power for families earning approximately RS 5,000 each month by 20%.  Most low-income families spend 50–70% of their total income on food alone. In 2023, the government announced an increase in the stipend amount up to Rs. 8500, which is expected to benefit millions of households across the country and will allow a family of 5–6 to purchase 20–25 days' worth of flour.

Criticism
Since the program's inception, critics have pointed out several overall flaws in the Benazir Income Support Program design.  Some claim that the amount of RS 3000 bi-monthly, or RS 1,500 per month, is not enough to move impoverished families above the poverty line as this would require RS 2,550 per month.  Another major flaw with BISP is its lack of conditionality.  Conditional cash transfer programs in Latin America have experienced greater degrees of success because recipient families must meet certain requirements before receiving a cash payment.  These programs build human capital through requiring recipients to enroll their children in primary education, participate in health and nutrition seminars, and visit health care providers. The BISP programmes also seems to be moving to this direction given that that Waseela-e-Taleem and Nashonuma component are both conditional requiring beneficiaries' to change both health and education seeking behaviour. The Unconditional Cash Transfer component of the BISP previously renamed Kifalat, is also being built up to encourage savings which would be matched by through government subsidies. Some experts have argued that attaching conditionalities to social safety net programmes moves them away from the conception of Negative Income Tax initially proposed by Milton Friedman by assuming that it is behaviour on part of the beneficiaries which is to blame for their poverty while ignoring deep rooted structural inequalities in society which may limit individual's ability to effectively participate in the labour Market. One such example from Pakistan is that of transgenders who would be restricted from accessing the labour market in any meaningful manner unless the society around them changes.

There have also been accusations of corruption and political favouritism.  By some estimates, only 50–60 percent of beneficiaries actually receive cash payments from BISP. The previous method of identifying families through the recommendation of Parliamentarians was flawed.  Many have claimed that Parliamentarians simply recommended their own family and friends to receive cash payments.  It has been pointed out that there is a disproportionate number of families receiving BISP aid in geographic areas where the ruling Pakistan People's Party dominates.  For example, in the Prime Minister's hometown of Multan, there is twice the number of people receiving BISP payments than in Lahore, the opposition party's stronghold.  Punjab, another area where opposition parties dominate, has the lowest ratio of eligible families—1,974 for every 100,000 people; versus 6,829 families for every 100,000 people in Sindh, the ruling party's stronghold.  Beneficiaries have also complained that the postal service charges an additional RS 100 to RS 200 for each delivery of payment.

Other critics have argued that as the Benazir Income Support Programme makes up a substantial portion of the Pakistani government's budget, impact evaluations should be conducted to evaluate the benefits and actual need for the program.

List of Chairpersons of Benazir Income Support Program

See also 

 Ehsaas Programme

References

Sources

 
 
 
 
 

Welfare in Pakistan
Government of Yousaf Raza Gillani
Memorials to Benazir Bhutto
2008 introductions
2008 establishments in Pakistan
Government aid programs